Mediterranean tropical-like cyclones, often referred to as medicanes (a portmanteau of Mediterranean hurricanes) but sometimes also as Mediterranean cyclones or as Mediterranean hurricanes, are meteorological phenomena occasionally observed over the Mediterranean Sea. On a few rare occasions, some storms have been observed reaching the strength of a Category 1 hurricane, on the Saffir–Simpson scale, and one storm has been recorded reaching Category 2 intensity. The main societal hazard posed by medicanes is not usually from destructive winds, but through life-threatening torrential rains and flash floods.

The occurrence of medicanes has been described as not particularly rare. Tropical-like systems were first identified in the Mediterranean basin in the 1980s, when widespread satellite coverage showing tropical-looking low pressures which formed a cyclonic eye in the center were identified. Due to the dry nature of the Mediterranean region, the formation of tropical, subtropical cyclones and tropical-like cyclones are infrequent and also hard to detect, in particular with the reanalysis of past data. Depending on the search algorithms used, different long-term surveys of satellite era and pre-satellite era data came up with 67 tropical-like cyclones of tropical storm intensity or higher between 1947 and 2014, and around 100 recorded tropical-like storms between 1947 and 2011. More consensus exists about the long term temporal and spatial distribution of tropical-like cyclones: they form predominantly over the western and central Mediterranean Sea while the area east of Crete is almost devoid of tropical-like cyclones. The development of tropical-like cyclones can occur year-round, with activity historically peaking between the months of September and January, while the counts for the summer months of June and July are the lowest, being within the peak dry season of the Mediterranean with stable air.

Meteorological classification and history

Historically, the term tropical-like cyclone was coined in the 1980s to unofficially distinguish tropical cyclones developing outside the tropics (like in the Mediterranean Basin) from those developing inside the tropics. The term tropical-like was in no way meant to indicate a hybrid cyclone exhibiting characteristics not usually seen in "true" tropical cyclones. In their matured stages, Mediterranean tropical cyclones show no difference from other tropical storms. And only tropical storms are known to develop into hurricanes. Mediterranean hurricanes or medicanes are therefore not different from hurricanes elsewhere.

Mediterranean tropical-like cyclones are not considered to be formally classified tropical cyclones and their region of formation is not officially monitored by any agency with meteorological tasks. However, the NOAA subsidiary Satellite Analysis Branch released information related to a medicane in November 2011 while it was active, which they dubbed as "Tropical Storm 01M", though they ceased services in the Mediterranean on 16 December 2011 for undisclosed reasons. However, in 2015, the NOAA resumed services in the Mediterranean region; by 2016, the NOAA was issuing advisories on a new tropical system, Tropical Storm 90M. Since 2005, ESTOFEX has been issuing bulletins that can include tropical-like cyclones, among others. No agency with meteorological tasks, however, is officially responsible for monitoring the formation and development of medicanes, as well as for their naming.

Despite all this, the whole Mediterranean Sea lies within the Greek area of responsibility with the Hellenic National Meteorological Service (HNMS) as the governing agency, while France's Météo-France serves as a "preparation service" for the western part of the Mediterranean as well. As the only official agency covering the whole Mediterranean Sea, HNMS publications are of particular interest for the classification of medicanes. HNMS calls the meteorological phenomenon Mediterranean tropical-like Hurricane in its annual bulletin and – by also using the respective portmanteau word medicane– makes the term medicane quasi-official. In a joint article with the Laboratory of Climatology and Atmospheric Environment of the University of Athens, the Hellenic National Meteorological Service outlines conditions to consider a cyclone over the Mediterranean Sea a Medicane: 

Several notable and damaging medicanes are known to have occurred. In September 1969, a North African Mediterranean tropical cyclone produced flooding that killed nearly 600 individuals, left 250,000 homeless, and crippled local economies. A medicane in September 1996 that developed in the Balearic Islands region spawned six tornadoes, and inundated parts of the islands. Several medicanes have also been subject to extensive study, such as those of January 1982, January 1995, September 2006, November 2011, and November 2014. The January 1995 storm is one of the best-studied Mediterranean tropical cyclones, with its close resemblance to tropical cyclones elsewhere and availability of observations. The medicane of September 2006, meanwhile, is well-studied, due to the availability of existing observations and data.

Given the low profile of HNMS in forecasting and classifying tropical-like systems in the Mediterranean, a proper classification system for Mediterranean tropical-like cyclones does not exist. The HNMS criterion of a cyclonic eye for considering a system a medicane is usually valid for a system at peak strength, often only hours before landfall, which is not suitable at least for forecasts and warnings.

Unofficially, Deutscher Wetterdienst (DWD, the German meteorological service) proposed a system to forecast and classify tropical-like cyclones based on the NHC classification for the northern Atlantic Ocean. The DWD proposal and also US-based forecasts (NHC, NOAA, NRL etc.) use one-minute sustained winds while European-based forecasts use ten-minute sustained winds which makes a difference of roughly 14% in measurements. The distinction is also of direct practical use (for example for a comparison of NOAA bulletins with EUMETSAT, ESTOFEX and HNMS bulletins). To account for the difference, the DWD proposal is shown below for both one-minute and deduced ten-minute sustained winds (see tropical cyclone scales for conversions):

Another proposal uses roughly the same scale but suggests to use the term medicane for tropical storm force cyclones and major medicane for hurricane force cyclones.

Climatology 

A majority of Mediterranean tropical cyclones (tropical cyclogenesis) form over two separate regions. The first, more conducive for development than the other, encompasses an area of the western Mediterranean bordered by the Balearic Islands, southern France, and the shorelines of the islands of Corsica and Sardinia. The second identified region of development, in the Ionian Sea between Sicily and Greece and stretching south to Libya, is less favorable for tropical cyclogenesis. An additional two regions, in the Aegean and Adriatic seas, produce fewer medicanes, while activity is minimal in the Levantine region. The geographical distribution of Mediterranean tropical-like cyclones is markedly different from that of other cyclones, with the formation of regular cyclones centering on the Pyrenees and Atlas mountain ranges, the Gulf of Genoa, and the island of Cyprus in the Ionian Sea. Although meteorological factors are most advantageous in the Adriatic and Aegean seas, the closed nature of the region's geography, bordered by land, allows little time for further evolution.

The geography of mountain ranges bordering the Mediterranean are conducive for severe weather and thunderstorms, with the sloped nature of mountainous regions permitting the development of convective activity. Although the geography of the Mediterranean region, as well as its dry air, typically prevent the formation of tropical cyclones, when certain meteorological circumstances arise, difficulties influenced by the region's geography are overcome. The occurrence of tropical cyclones in the Mediterranean Sea is generally extremely rare, with an average of 1.57 forming annually and merely 99 recorded occurrences of tropical-like storms discovered between 1948 and 2011 in a modern study, with no definitive trend in activity in that period. Few medicanes form during the summer season, though activity typically rises in autumn, peaks in January, and gradually decreases from February to May. In the western Mediterranean region of development, approximately 0.75 such systems form each year, compared with 0.32 in the Ionian Sea region. However, on very rare occasions, similar tropical-like storms may also develop in the Black Sea.

Studies have evaluated that global warming can result in higher observed intensities of tropical cyclones as a result of deviations in the surface energy flux and atmospheric composition, which both heavily influence the development of medicanes as well. In tropical and subtropical areas, sea surface temperatures (SSTs) rose  within a 50-year period, and in the North Atlantic and Northwestern Pacific tropical cyclone basins, the potential destructiveness and energy of storms nearly doubled within the same duration, evidencing a clear correlation between global warming and tropical cyclone intensities. In 2006, a computer-driven atmospheric model evaluated the future frequency of Mediterranean cyclones between 2071 and 2100, projecting a decrease in autumn, winter, and spring cyclonic activity coinciding with a dramatic increase in formation near Cyprus, with both scenarios attributed to elevated temperatures as a result of global warming. In another study, researchers found that more tropical-like storms in the Mediterranean could reach Category 1 strength by the end of the 21st Century, with most of the stronger storms appearing in the autumn, though the models indicated that some storms could potentially reach Category 2 intensity. Other studies, however, have been inconclusive, forecasting both increases and decreases in duration, number, and intensity. Three independent studies, using different methodologies and data, evaluated that while medicane activity would likely decline with a rate depending on the climate scenario considered, a higher percentage of those that formed would be of greater strength.

Development and characteristics 

The development of tropical or subtropical cyclones in the Mediterranean Sea can usually only occur under somewhat unusual circumstances. Low wind shear and atmospheric instability induced by incursions of cold air are often required. A majority of medicanes are also accompanied by upper-level troughs, providing energy required for intensifying atmospheric convection—thunderstorms—and heavy precipitation. The baroclinic properties of the Mediterranean region, with high temperature gradients, also provides necessary instability for the formation of tropical cyclones. Another factor, rising cool air, provides necessary moisture as well. Warm sea surface temperatures (SSTs) are mostly unnecessary, however, as most medicanes' energy are derived from warmer air temperatures. When these favorable circumstances coincide, the genesis of warm-core Mediterranean tropical cyclones, often from within existing cut-off cold-core lows, is possible in a conducive environment for formation.

Factors required for the formation of medicanes are somewhat different from that normally expected of tropical cyclones; known to emerge over regions with sea surface temperatures (SSTs) below , Mediterranean tropical cyclones often require incursions of colder air to induce atmospheric instability. Despite the low sea surface temperatures, the instability incited by cold atmospheric air within a baroclinic zone—regions with high differences in temperature and pressure—permits the formation of medicanes, in contrast with tropical areas lacking high baroclinity, where raised SSTs are needed. While significant deviations in air temperature have been noted around the time of Mediterranean tropical cyclones' formation, few anomalies in sea surface temperature coincide with their development, indicating that the formation of medicanes is primarily controlled by higher air temperatures, not by anomalous SSTs. Similar to tropical cyclones, minimal wind shear—difference in wind speed and direction over a region—as well as abundant moisture and vorticity encourages the genesis of tropical cyclone-like systems in the Mediterranean Sea.

Due to the confined character of the Mediterranean and the limited capability of heat fluxes—in the case of medicanes, air—sea heat transfer—tropical cyclones with a diameter larger than  cannot exist within the Mediterranean. Despite being a relatively baroclinic area with high temperature gradients, the primary energy source utilized by Mediterranean tropical cyclones is derived from underlying heat sources generated by the presence of convection—thunderstorm activity—in a humid environment, similar to tropical cyclones elsewhere outside the Mediterranean Sea. In comparison with other tropical cyclone basins, the Mediterranean Sea generally presents a difficult environment for development; although the potential energy necessary for development is not abnormally large, its atmosphere is characterized by its lack of moisture, impeding potential formation. The full development of a medicane often necessitates the formation of a large-scale baroclinic disturbance, transitioning late in its life cycle into a tropical cyclone-like system, nearly always under the influence of a deep, cut-off, cold-core low within the middle-to-upper troposphere, frequently resulting from abnormalities in a wide-spreading Rossby wave—massive meanders of upper-atmospheric winds.

The development of medicanes often results from the vertical shift of air in the troposphere as well, resulting in a decrease in its temperature coinciding with an increase in relative humidity, creating an environment more conducive for tropical cyclone formation. This, in turn, leads to in an increase in potential energy, producing heat-induced air-sea instability. Moist air prevents the occurrence of convective downdrafts—the vertically downward movement of air—which often hinder the inception of tropical cyclones, and in such a scenario, wind shear remains minimal; overall, cold-core cut-off lows serve well for the later formation of compact surface flux-influenced warm-core lows such as medicanes. The regular genesis of cold-core upper-level lows and the infrequency of Mediterranean tropical cyclones, however, indicate that additional unusual circumstances are involved the emergence of the latter. Elevated sea surface temperatures, contrasting with cold atmospheric air, encourage atmospheric instability, especially within the troposphere.

Weak rotation, similar to that in most tropical cyclones, is usually noted in a medicane's early stages, increasing with intensity; medicanes, however, often have less time to intensify, remaining weaker than most North Atlantic hurricanes and only persisting for the duration of a few days. The theoretical maximum potential intensity of medicanes is equivalent to the lowest classification on the Saffir–Simpson hurricane wind scale, a Category 1 hurricane. While the entire lifetime of a cyclone may encompass several days, most will only retain tropical characteristics for less than 24 hours. Circumstances sometimes permit the formation of smaller-scale medicanes, although the required conditions differ even from those needed by other medicanes. The development of abnormally small tropical cyclones in the Mediterranean usually requires upper-level atmospheric cyclones inducing cyclogenesis in the lower atmosphere, leading to the formation of warm-core lows, encouraged by favorable moisture, heat, and other environmental circumstances.

Mediterranean cyclones have been compared with polar lows—cyclonic storms which typically develop in the far regions of the Northern and Southern Hemispheres—for their similarly small size and heat-related instability; however, while medicanes nearly always feature warm-core lows, polar lows are primarily cold-core. The prolonged life of medicanes and similarity to polar lows is caused primarily by origins as synoptic-scale surface lows and heat-related instability. Heavy precipitation and convection within a developing Mediterranean tropical cyclone are usually incited by the approach of an upper-level trough—an elongated area of low air pressures—bringing downstream cold air, encircling an existing low-pressure system. After this occurs, however, a considerable reduction in rainfall rates occurs despite further organization, coinciding with a decrease in previously high lightning activity as well. Although troughs will often accompany medicanes along their track, separation eventually occurs, usually in the later part of a Mediterranean tropical cyclone's life cycle. At the same time, moist air, saturated and cooled while rising into the atmosphere, then encounters the medicane, permitting further development and evolution into a tropical cyclone. Many of these characteristics are also evident in polar lows, except for the warm core characteristic.

Notable medicanes and impacts

22–27 Sep 1969 

An unusually severe Mediterranean tropical cyclone developed on 23 September 1969 southeast of Malta, producing severe flooding. Steep pressure and temperature gradients above the Atlas mountain range were evident on 19 September, a result of cool sea air attempting to penetrate inland; south of the mountains, a lee depression—a low-pressure area in a mountainous region—developed. Under the influence of mountainous terrain, the low initially meandered northeastward. Following the entry of cool sea air, however, it recurved to the southeast before transitioning into a Saharan depression associated with a distinct cold front by 22 September. Along the front's path, desert air moved northward while cold air drifted in the opposite direction, and in northern Libya, warm arid air clashed with the cooler levant of the Mediterranean. The organization of the disturbance improved slightly further before emerging into the Mediterranean Sea on 23 September, upon which the system experienced immediate cyclogenesis, rapidly intensifying while southeast of Malta as a cold-core cut-off low, and acquiring tropical characteristics. In western Africa, meanwhile, several disturbances converged toward Mauritania and Algeria, while the medicane recurved southwestward back toward the coast, losing its closed circulation and later dissipating.

The cyclone produced severe flooding throughout regions of northern Africa. In Malta, a 20000-ton tanker struck a reef and split in two, while in Gafsa, Tunisia, the cyclone flooded phosphate mines, leaving over 25,000 miners unemployed and costing the government over £2 million per week. Thousands of camels and snakes, drowned by flood waters, were swept out to sea, and massive Roman bridges, which withstood all floods since the fall of the Roman Empire, collapsed. In all, the floods in Tunisia and Algeria killed almost 600 individuals, left 250,000 homeless, and severely damaged regional economies. Due to communication problems, however, flood relief funds and television appeals were not set up until nearly a month later.

Leucosia (24–27 Jan 1982) 

The unusual Mediterranean tropical storm of January 1982, dubbed Leucosia, was first detected in waters north of Libya. The storm likely reached the Atlas mountain range as a low-pressure area by 23 January 1982, reinforced by an elongated, slowly-drifting trough above the Iberian Peninsula. A hook-shaped cloud developed within the system shortly thereafter, rotating as it elongated into a -long comma-shaped apparatus. After looping around Sicily, it drifted eastward between the island and Peloponnese, recurving on its track again, exhibiting clearly curved spiral banding before shrinking slightly. The system slightly reintensified, however, for a six-hour period on 26 January.

The Global Weather Center's Cyclone Weather Center of the United States Air Force (USAF) initiated "Mediterranean Cyclone Advisories" on the cyclone at six-hour intervals starting at 1800 UTC on 27 January, until 0600 UTC on the following day. Convection was most intense in the eastern sector of the cyclone as it drifted east-northeastward. The cyclone passed by Malta, Italy, and Greece before dissipating several days later, in the extreme eastern Mediterranean. Observations related to the cyclone, however, were inadequate, and although the system maintained numerous tropical characteristics, it is possible it was merely a compact but powerful extratropical cyclone exhibiting a clear eye, spiral banding, towering cumulonimbi, and high surface winds along the eyewall.

27 Sep – 2 October 1983
On 27 September 1983, a medicane was observed at sea between Tunisia and Sicily, looping around Sardinia and Corsica, coming ashore twice on the islands, before making landfall at Tunis early on 2 October and dissipating. The development of the system was not encouraged by baroclinic instability; rather, convection was incited by abnormally high sea surface temperatures (SSTs) at the time of its formation. It also featured a definitive eye, tall cumulonimbus clouds, intense sustained winds, and a warm core.

Celeno (14–17 Jan 1995) 

Among numerous documented medicanes, the cyclone of January 1995, which was dubbed Celeno, is generally considered to be the best-documented instance in the 20th century. The storm emerged from the Libyan coast and moved toward the Ionian shoreline of Greece on 13 January as a compact low-pressure area. Upon the low's approach near Greece, it began to envelop an area of atmospheric convection; meanwhile, in the middle troposphere, a trough extended from Russia to the Mediterranean, bringing with it extremely cold temperatures. Two low-pressure areas were present along the path of the trough, with one situated above Ukraine and the other above the central Mediterranean, likely associated with a low-level cyclone over western Greece. Upon weakening and dissipation on 14 January, a second low, the system which would evolve into the Mediterranean tropical cyclone, developed in its place on 15 January.

At the time of formation, high clouds indicated the presence of intense convection, and the cyclone featured an axisymmetric cloud structure, with a distinct, cloud-free eye and rainbands spiraling around the disturbance as a whole. Soon thereafter, the parent low separated from the medicane entirely and continued eastward, meandering toward the Aegean Sea and Turkey. The system's atmospheric pressure increased throughout 15 January due to the fact it was embedded within a large-scale environment, with its rising pressure due to the general prevalence of higher air pressures throughout the region, and was not a sign of weakening.

Initial wind speeds within the young medicane were generally low, with sustained winds of merely , with the highest recorded value associated with the disturbance being  at 0000 UTC on 16 January, slightly below the threshold for tropical storm on the Saffir–Simpson hurricane wind scale. Intense convection continued to follow the entire path of the system as it traversed the Mediterranean, and the cyclone made landfall in northern Libya at approximately 1800 UTC on 17 January, rapidly weakening after coming ashore. Although the system retained its strong convection for several more hours, the cyclone's cloud tops began to warm, evidencing lower clouds, before losing tropical characteristics entirely on 17 January. Offshore ship reports recorded that the medicane produced intense winds, copious rainfall, and abnormally warm temperatures.

11–13 Sep 1996 
Three notable medicanes developed in 1996. The first, in mid-September 1996, was a typical Mediterranean tropical cyclone that developed in the Balearic Islands region. At the time of the cyclone's formation, a powerful Atlantic cold front and a warm front associated with a large-scale low, producing northeasterly winds over the Iberian peninsula, extended eastward into the Mediterranean, while abundant moisture gathered in the lower troposphere over the Balearic channel. On the morning of 12 September, a disturbance developed off of Valencia, Spain, dropping heavy rainfall on the coast even without coming ashore. An eye developed shortly thereafter as the system rapidly traversed across Majorca and Sardinia in its eastward trek.

At Valencia and other regions of eastern Spain, the storm generated heavy precipitation, while six tornadoes touched down over the Balearic Islands. Medicanes as small as the one that formed in September 1996 are atypical, and often require circumstances different even from those required for regular Mediterranean tropical cyclone formation. Warm low-level advection–transfer of heat through air or sea–caused by a large-scale low over the western Mediterranean was a primary factor in the rise of strong convection. The presence of a mid- to upper-level cut-off cold-core low, a method of formation typical to medicanes, was also key to the development of intense thunderstorms within the cyclone. In addition, interaction between a northeastward-drifting trough, the medicane, and the large-scale also permitted the formation of tornadoes within thunderstorms generated by the cyclone after making landfall.

4–6 Oct 1996 

The second of the three recorded Mediterranean tropical cyclones in 1996 formed between Sicily and Tunisia on 4 October, making landfall on both Sicily and southern Italy. The medicane generated major flooding in Sicily.

Cornelia (6–11 Oct 1996) 

The third major Mediterranean tropical cyclone of that year formed north of Algeria, and strengthened while sweeping between the Balearic Islands and Sardinia, with an eye-like feature prominent on satellite. The storm was unofficially named Cornelia. The eye of the storm was distorted and disappeared after transiting over southern Sardinia throughout the evening of 8 October, with the system weakening as a whole. Extreme damage was reported in the Aeolian Islands after the tropical cyclone passed north of Sicily, though the system dissipated while turning southward over Calabria. Both October systems featured distinctive spiral bands, intense convection, high sustained winds, and abundant precipitation.

Querida (25–27 Sep 2006) 

A short-lived medicane, named Querida by the Free University of Berlin, developed near the end of September 2006, along the coast of Italy. The origins of the medicane can be traced to the alpine Atlas mountain range on the evening of 25 September, likely forming as a normal lee cyclone. At 0600 UTC on 26 September, European Centre for Medium-Range Weather Forecasts (ECMWF) model analyses indicated the existence of two low-pressure areas along the shoreline of Italy, one on the west coast, sweeping eastward across the Tyrrhenian Sea, while the other, slightly more intense, low was located over the Ionian Sea. As the latter low approached the Strait of Sicily, it met an eastward-moving convection-producing cold front, resulting in significant intensification, while the system simultaneously reduced in size. It then achieved a minimum atmospheric pressure of approximately  after transiting north-northeastward across the -wide Salentine peninsula in the course of roughly 30 minutes at 0915 UTC the same day.

Wind gusts surpassing  were recorded as it passed over Salento due to a steep pressure gradient associated with it, confirmed by regional radar observations denoting the presence of a clear eye. The high winds inflicted moderate damages throughout the peninsula, though specific damage is unknown. Around 1000 UTC, both radar and satellite recorded the system's entry into the Adriatic Sea and its gradual northwestward curve back toward the Italian coast. The cyclone weakened while drifting further inland over the Italian mainland, eventually dissipating as it curved west-southwestward. A later study in 2008 evaluated that the cyclone possessed numerous characteristics seen in tropical cyclones elsewhere, with a spiral appearance, eye-like apparatus, rapid atmospheric pressure decreases in advance of landfall, and intense sustained winds, concentrated near the storm's eyewall; the apparent eye-like structure in the cyclone, however, was ill-defined. Since then, the medicane has been the subject of significant study as a result of the availability of scientific observations and reports related to the cyclone. In particular, the sensitivity of this cyclone to sea-surface temperatures, initial conditions, the model, and the parameterization schemes used in the simulations were analyzed. The relevance of different instability indices for the diagnosis and the prediction of these events were also studied.

Rolf (6–9 Nov 2011)

In November 2011, the first officially designated Mediterranean tropical cyclone by the National Oceanic and Atmospheric Administration (NOAA) formed, christened as Tropical Storm 01M by the Satellite Analysis Branch, and given the name Rolf by the Free University of Berlin (FU Berlin), despite the fact that no agency is officially responsible for monitoring tropical cyclone activity in the Mediterranean. On 4 November 2011, a frontal system associated with another low-pressure area monitored by FU Berlin, designated Quinn, spawned a second low-pressure system inland near Marseille, which was subsequently named Rolf by the university. An upper-level trough on the European mainland stalled as it approached the Pyrenees, before approaching and interacting with the low known as Rolf. Heavy rainfall consequently fell over regions of southern France and northwestern Italy, resulting in widespread landslides and flooding. A stationary front, stationed between Madrid and Lisbon, approached Rolf the same day, with the cold front later encountering and becoming associated with Rolf, which would continue for a couple of days.

Slightly weakening, Rolf neared the Balearic Islands on 7 November, associating with two fronts producing heavy rain throughout Europe, before separating entirely and transitioning into a cut-off low. On the same day, the NOAA began monitoring the system, designating it as 01M, marking the first time that the agency officially monitored a Medicane. A distinct eye-like feature developed while spiral banding and intense convection became evident. At its highest, the Dvorak technique classified the system as T3.0. Convection then gradually decreased, and a misalignment of the mid- and upper-level centers was noted. The cyclone made landfall on 9 November near Hyères in France. The system continued to rapidly weaken on 9 November, before advisories on the system were discontinued later that day, and FU Berlin followed suit by 10 November, removing the name Rolf from its weather maps and declaring the storm's dissipation. The deep warm core of this cyclone persisted for a longer time compared to most of the other documented tropical-like cyclones in the Mediterranean.

The storm caused at least $1.25 billion (2011 USD) in damages in Italy and France. The sum of fatalities totaled 12 people from Italy and France.

Qendresa (7–9 Nov 2014) 

On 6 November 2014, the low-level circulation centre of Qendresa formed near Kerkennah Islands. As the system was moving north-northeastwards and combining with an upper-level low from Tunisia early on 7 November, the system occluded quickly and intensified dramatically with an eye-like feature, thanks to favourable conditions. The central pressure was presumed to be . Interacting with Sicily, the cyclone turned northeastwards and started to make an anticlockwise loop. On 8 November, Qendresa crossed Syracuse in the morning and then significantly weakened. Turning southeastwards then moving eastwards, Qendresa moved over Crete, before dissipating over the island on 11 November.

90M/"Trixi" (28–31 Oct 2016) 

Early on 28 October 2016,  an extratropical cyclone began to develop to the south of Calabria, in the Ionian sea. However, later that day, it began to re-intensify and underwent a tropical transition. It became a tropical storm on 31 October. After passing over Crete, the storm began to quickly weaken, with the storm degenerating into an extratropical low on 1 November. Tropical Storm 90M was also nicknamed "Medicane Trixi" by some media outlets in Europe during its duration.

No fatalities or rainfall statistics have been reported for this system that was over open waters for most of the time.

Numa (16–19 Nov 2017) 

On 11 November 2017, the remnant of Tropical Storm Rina from the Atlantic contributed to the formation of a new extratropical cyclone, west of the British Isles, which later absorbed Rina on the next day. On 12 November, the new storm was named Numa by the Free University of Berlin. On 14 November 2017, Extratropical Cyclone Numa emerged into the Adriatic Sea. On the following day, while crossing Italy, Numa began to undergo a subtropical transition, though the system was still extratropical by 16 November. The storm began to impact Greece as a strong storm on 16 November. Some computer models forecast that Numa could transition into a warm-core subtropical or tropical cyclone within the next few days. On 17 November, Numa completely lost its frontal system. On the afternoon of the same day, Météo France tweeted that Numa had attained the status of a subtropical Mediterranean depression. According to ESTOFEX, Numa showed numerous  flags of 10-minute sustained winds in satellite data. Between 18:00 UTC on 17 November and 5:00 UTC on 18 November, Numa acquired evident tropical characteristics, and began to display a hurricane-like structure. ESTOFEX again reported . The cyclone rapidly weakened into a low-pressure area, before emerging into the Aegean Sea on 19 November. On 20 November, Numa was absorbed into another extratropical storm approaching from the north.

Numa hit Greece at a time when the soil was already heavily soaked from other storm systems that did arrive before Numa. No rainfall forecasts or measurements are known for the following days while Numa was still battering Greece. Numa resulted in 21 reported deaths. At least 1,500 homes were flooded, and residents had to evacuate their homes. The storm caused an estimated US$100 million in damages in Europe and was the deadliest weather event Greece had experienced since 1977.

Zorbas (27 Sep – 1 October 2018)

 
A first outlook about the possible development of a shallow warm-core cyclone in the Mediterranean was issued by ESTOFEX on 25 September 2018, and a second extended outlook was issued on 26 September 2018. On 27 September 2018, an extratropical storm developed in the eastern Mediterranean Sea. Water temperatures of around  supported the storm's transition into a hybrid cyclone, with a warm thermal core in the center. The storm moved northeastward toward Greece, gradually intensifying and developing characteristics of a tropical cyclone.

It is unknown who named the system Zorbas, but the name is officially recognized for a medicane by the Deutscher Wetterdienst.  Early on 1 October, Zorbas emerged into the Aegean Sea, while accelerating northeastward. On 2 October, Zorbas moved over northwestern Turkey and dissipated. A cold wake was observed in the Mediterranean Sea, with sea surface temperatures dropping  along the track of Zorbas due to strong upwelling.

The floods killed five people in Tunisia, while also damaging homes, roads, and fields. The Tunisian government pledged financial assistance to residents whose homes were damaged. In advance of the storm's landfall in Greece, the Hellenic National Meteorological Office issued a severe warning. Several flights were canceled, and schools were closed. The offshore islands of Strofades and Rhodes reported gale-force winds during the storm's passage. The storm spawned a waterspout that moved onshore. Gale-force winds in Athens knocked down trees and power lines. A fallen tree destroyed the roof of a school in western Athens. Dozens of roads were closed due to flooding. In Ioannina, the storm damaged the minaret on the top of the Aslan Pasha Mosque, which dates to 1614. Three people were reporting missing in Greece after the flash floods; one person was found dead, but the other two individuals remained missing, as of 3 October. Zorbas was estimated to have caused millions of dollars (2018 USD) in damages.

Ianos (14–20 Sep 2020)

Weather models predicted that it would likely hit the west coast of Greece on 17 or 18 September. Ianos gradually intensified over the Mediterranean Sea, acquiring an eye-like feature.

Greece assigned the system the name "Ianos", sometimes anglicized to "Janus", while the German weather service used the name "Udine"; the Turkish used "Tulpar", and the Italians "Cassilda". As Ianos passed to the south of Italy on 16 September, it produced heavy rain across the southern part of the country and in Sicily.

Ianos left four dead people and one missing, in addition to strong tides in Ionian islands such as Kefalonia, Zakynthos, Ithaca and Lefkada, and  winds at Karditsa which brought down trees and power lines, and caused landslides.

Apollo (22 Oct – 2 Nov 2021) 

Around 22 October 2021, an area of organized thunderstorms formed near the Balearic Islands, with the disturbance becoming more organized and developing an area of low pressure around 24 October. The low started to form a low level center the next day and moved around the Tyrrhenian Sea, and around 28 October, the low became better organized, prompting forecast offices in Europe to name it.

The most commonly used name for the cyclone is Apollo, which was used by the Free University of Berlin. On the same day, the agency Meteo of the National Observatory of Athens in Greece named it Nearchus, after the voyager of the same name.

Heavy rain from the cyclone and its precursor caused heavy rainfall and flooding in Tunisia, Algeria, Southern Italy, and Malta, killing seven people in total. The storm caused over US$245 million (€219 million) in damages.

Blas (5–18 Nov 2021) 

On 5 November, the Spanish Meteorological Agency (AEMET) started tracking a low near the Balearic Islands and named it Blas. An orange alert was issued for these islands, for coastal impacts and rain. The north of Catalonia was declared an Orange Zone, as strong winds blew inland from the Spanish Navarre and Aragon. Météo-France also issued a yellow alert for Aude and Pyrénées-Orientales for wind, as well as Corsica for rain. As the system stalled between Sardinia and the Balearic Islands on 8 November, AEMET predicted a strengthening trend for the next two days and maintained its alerts. At 00:00 UTC on 11 November, the system came very close to the Balearic Islands again. On 13 November, the storm developed a spiral structure similar to those of tropical cyclones, while shedding its frontal structure. After striking the islands again, the storm then slowly weakened while drifting back southeastward. On 14 November, the cyclone turned northward, moving over Sardinia and Corsica, before curving back southwestward on 15 November and moving over Sardinia again, while restrengthening in the process. On 16 November, Blas turned eastward once again, passing just south of Sardinia and moving towards Italy, before dissipating over the Tyrrhenian Sea on 18 November.

Menorca was cut off from the world after the closure of the ports of Mahón and Ciutadella. On 9 and 10 November, Blas brought high winds and heavy rain again to the Balearic Islands, causing at least 36 incidents, mostly flooding, landslides and blackouts. On 6 November, a waterspout was reported in Melilla, a Spanish enclave on the coast of Morocco. The storm caused severe weather on the Algerian coast, with exceptional rainfall. On 9 November, a building collapsed in Algiers, following torrential rains on the city, causing the deaths of three people. On 11 November, the heavy rain falling on Algiers caused another landslide to strike houses in the Raïs Hamidou neighborhood, causing the deaths of three other people. From 8 to 11 November, convective bands associated with the storm caused 3 deaths in Sicily, bringing the total death toll to nine people. Damage from the storm has not yet been assessed.

Other tropical-like cyclones 
Numerous other Mediterranean tropical-like cyclones have occurred, but few have been as well-documented as the medicanes in 1969, 1982, 1983, 1995, 1996, 2006, 2011, 2014, 2017, 2018 and 2020. These not-so-much investigated tropical-like cyclones and their dates are given below.

A first study in 2000 revealed five notable and well-developed medicanes. A second study in 2013 revealed several additional storms with their formation days and also additional information on medicanes. A third study, conducted in 2007, revealed additional storms with their formation days. A fourth study from 2013 presented several other cyclones and their days of development. A survey made by EUMETSAT resulted in many more cyclones.

 September 1947
 September 1973
 18–20 August 1976
 26 March 1983
 7 April 1984, 
 29–30 December 1984
 14–18 December 1985 
 January 1991, 5 December 1991 
 21–25 October 1994
 10–13 December 1996 
 22–27 September 1997, 30–31 October 1997, 5–8 December 1997
 25–27 January 1998 
 19–21 March 1999, 13 September 1999
 10 September 2000, 9 October 2000
 27–28 May 2003, 16–19 September 2003, 27–28 September 2003, 8 October 2003
 19–21 September 2004, 3–5 November 2004
 August 2005, 15–16 September 2005, 22–23 October 2005, 26–28 October 2005, 14–16 December 2005
 9 August 2006
 19–23 March 2007 16–18 October 2007, 26 October 2007
 June 2008, August 2008, September 2008, 4 December 2008
 January 2009, May 2009, twice in September 2009, October 2009
 12–14 October 2010, 2–4 November 2010
 Twice in February 2012, 13–15 April 2012.
 "Scott", October 2019
 "Trudy" ("Detlef"), November 2019
 November 2020
 03M/"Elaina", December 2020
 Cyclone Hannelore, January 2023
 Cyclone Helios, February 2023
Cyclone Juliette, February-March 2023

Climatological statistics 
There have been 100 recognized tropical-like cyclones in the Mediterranean Sea between 1947 and 2021 from the databases of the Laboratory of Climatology and Atmospheric Environment, University of Athens, and METEOSAT. By steady accrual of reported and recognized occurrences of tropical-like cyclones (medicanes), the number count reached at least 89 by 15 November 2021. Unlike most northern hemisphere cyclone seasons, Mediterranean tropical-like cyclone activity peaks between the months of September and January. 

The numbers do not necessarily mean that all occurrences of medicanes have been fetched in particular before the end of the 1980s. With the development (and constant improvement) of satellite-based observations, the number count of clearly identified medicanes increased from the 1980s onward. There might be an additional impact from climate change in the frequency of the observed medicanes, but this is not deducible from the data.

Deadly storms
The following is a list of all medicanes that caused deaths.

Tropical-like cyclones in the Black Sea

On a number of occasions, tropical-like storms similar to the tropical-like cyclones observed in the Mediterranean have formed in the Black Sea, including storms on 21 March 2002, 7–11 August 2002, and 25–29 September 2005. The 25–29 September 2005 cyclone is particularly well-documented and investigated. No known cyclones in the Black Sea have attained hurricane strength.

See also 

Unusual areas of tropical cyclone formation
Tropical cyclone effects in Europe
European windstorm (fully extratropical)
South Atlantic tropical cyclone
1996 Lake Huron cyclone
2006 Central Pacific cyclone
Subtropical Storm 96C
Subtropical Cyclone Katie
Subtropical Cyclone Lexi
Tropical cyclone basins
Tropical cyclogenesis

References

Citations

Sources

External links

 Mediterranean Tropical Products Page – Satellite Services Division – Office of Satellite Data Processing and Distribution
 Northeast Atlantic and Mediterranean Imagery – NOAA
 

 
Tropical cyclone meteorology
Climate change and hurricanes
 
Types of cyclone
Natural disasters